David Hicks (born August 1, 1988) is an American professional basketball player, currently a free agent.

College career
David Hicks was a key member of the 2010 Long Island University, which made it to the 2011 NCAA basketball tournament. During his college career Hicks made 123 starts in the backcourt and finished his career with 1,157 points.

Professional career
After going undrafted in 2011, Hicks moved to Germany and played for UBC Münster, SG Schwelmer Baskets and Science City Jena. While there, he received player of the week honors while on the SG Schwelmer Baskets. On July 25, 2015 he signed to play with Ironi Nahariya after playing for Science City Jena. Following a stop in Latvia (Liepaja/Triobet), Hicks returned to Germany, signing with the Gotha Rockets in February 2017. He helped them reach the 2017 2. Bundesliga ProA finals and earn promotion to the top-tier Basketball Bundesliga. Hicks scored 13.8 points a game for the Rockets that season. In October 2017, he joined the Iowa Wolves in the NBA G League. After being waived, he returned to Germany, joining Schwelmer Baskets on November 24, 2017. He signed a one-month deal as an injury-replacement and appeared in four games with Schwelm, averaging 25.5 points, 4.8 rebounds as well as 4 assists per outing.

References

1988 births
Living people
American expatriate basketball people in Germany
American expatriate basketball people in Israel
American men's basketball players
Basketball players from Connecticut
LIU Brooklyn Blackbirds men's basketball players
Point guards
South Kent School alumni
People from Mendota Heights, Minnesota